JSmooth is a tool for wrapping Java JAR files into Windows Portable Executable EXE files. It allows specifying various details on how the program should be invoked, such as:
 Executable icon
 Program arguments
 Type of wrapper application (console or Windows GUI)
 Whether to launch the Java VM in the same process as the EXE or a separate process
 Maximum and initial memory allocation
 System properties available to the application via the System.getProperty function
JSmooth is distributed under the GNU General Public License, and is written in Java using Swing. Generated executables are built on MinGW, and as such there is no dependency on proprietary software.

Unlike other exe wrappers, JSmooth is 100%-Java, and can be used to create the Windows executable from a Linux compilation-chain (an ANT task is provided).

External links
Official site

Java development tools